The Alternative Press Expo (APE) was a comic book festival and alternative comics convention that operated from 1994 to 2017. Founded by Slave Labor Graphics publisher Dan Vado, APE focused on self-published, independent, and alternative cartoonists and comic publishers.

History  
APE was organized by Vado in 1994 as an event for artists to "promote themselves without having to drown out a 50-million-watt display by some huge publisher." The first APE was held as a one-day event in San Jose, California. 

Vado transferred management of APE to Comic-Con International in 1995. The event expanded to two days of programming in 1998, and included special guests Mike Allred, Jhonen Vasquez, Terry Moore, Batton Lash, Shannon Wheeler, and Jill Thompson. In 2000, APE moved to San Francisco, where it was held a one-day event at the Herbst Pavilion in Fort Mason, before moving to the Concourse Exhibition Center in 2003. The programming available at the event expanded under Comic-Con International, with APE 2005 offering panels, seminars, exhibitions and special guests. APE was moved to the fall beginning in 2008.

The final APE organized by Comic-Con International was held in 2014. Vado re-assumed management of the event that year, and returned APE to San Jose in 2015. The most recent APE was held in 2017, with special guests Jhonen Vasquez and Derf Backderf. , the event is no longer organized.

Event dates and locations

1994: June 4 — Parkside Hall, San Jose
1995: May 19 — San Jose
1996: March 23 — San Jose
1997: February 2 — San Jose
1998: February 21–22 — San Jose
1999: February 27–28 — San Jose
2000: February 5 — Herbst Pavilion, Fort Mason, San Francisco
2001: February 17–18 — Herbst Pavilion, Fort Mason, San Francisco
2002: February 9–10 — Herbst Pavilion, Fort Mason, San Francisco
2003: February 1–2 — Concourse Exhibition Center, San Francisco
2004: February 21–22 — Concourse Exhibition Center, San Francisco
2005: April 9–10 — Concourse Exhibition Center, San Francisco
2006: April 8–9 – Concourse Exhibition Center, San Francisco
2007: April 21–22 — Concourse Exhibition Center, San Francisco
2008: November 1–2 — Concourse Exhibition Center, San Francisco
 2009: October 17–18 — Concourse Exhibition Center, San Francisco
 2010: October 16–17 — Concourse Exhibition Center, San Francisco
 2011: October 1–2 — Concourse Exhibition Center, San Francisco
 2012: October 13–14 — Concourse Exhibition Center, San Francisco
 2013: October 12–13 – Concourse Exhibition Center, San Francisco
 2014: October 4–5 – Festival Pavilion, Fort Mason, San Francisco
 2015: October 3-4 – San Jose Convention Center, San Jose
 2016: October 8-9 – San Jose Convention Center, San Jose
 2017: September 23–24 – San Jose Convention Center, San Jose

References

External links

 
 Major Books Fairs in the United States of America
 Long Twitter thread by exhibitors about the 2017 Alternative Press Expo

Book fairs in the United States
Comics conventions in the United States
Defunct comics conventions
Recurring events established in 1994
San Francisco Bay Area conventions
Festivals established in 1994
Conventions in California